TVP Info is a Polish free-to-air television news channel, run by the public broadcaster, state media TVP. It is focused on newscasts, airing nationwide news bulletins from 6:00 a.m. to 12:00 a.m. Its main offices are located at the TVP news compound in central Warsaw.

History
TVP Info replaced TVP3 and was launched October 2007. It has regional branches in most of the major Polish cities and, similarly to France 3 in France or Rai Tre in Italy, for a couple of hours every day it broadcasts regional programming, including local news and reports in sixteen versions. These were transferred to the revived TVP Regionalna (which later was renamed TVP3 again) in September 2013. In addition, it disseminates certain programs on YouTube, where it has the TVP World channel.

Broadcasting via Astra 19.2°E started in 2005, but was discontinued on 31 December 2014 due to economic issues.

TVP Info has been broadcast in 16:9 since 23 February 2011. Its HD simulcast feed was launched on 30 September 2016 on digital terrestrial television and on 5 April 2017 on Hot Bird satellite. The SD feed was closed down there on 21 April 2017.

Just weeks after winning the 2015 parliamentary elections, the conservative Law and Justice party passed a media law in December 2015 giving the government direct control over public broadcasting. It is fully controlled by Poland's government, causing Reporters Without Borders to bemoan the fact.

The first media reports about TVP Info HD appeared in December 2014, which were confirmed in March 2015 by TVP president Juliusz Braun.

On 15 February 2016, TVP President Jacek Kurski announced in a media interview that he planned to launch TVP Info HD. In the night of 18 to 19 July 2016, due to the planned launch of TVP Info HD on the third digital terrestrial television multiplex, TVP Polonia was replaced. On 26 September 2016, TVP announced that the station would broadcast in HD resolution starting 30 September 2016. As per that date, TVP Info HD was available via the multiplex of the third digital terrestrial television and in cable networks. Via satellite, only the SD feed could be tuned in until 5 April 2017.

On 5 April 2017 at 1:00 pm, TVP Info HD started broadcasting via satellite. On 20 April 2017, TVP Info shut down its SD feed.

According to Kurski, the channel would be set to begin broadcasting in 1080i50 in early 2018, accompanied by a change of the scenery for the main studio of TVP Info.

TVP’s authorities decided to create the TVP World channel due to "the situation on the Polish-Belarusian border, and the need to produce honest and fair reporting, especially regarding issues that feature false reporting along with propaganda disinformation from Russia and Belarus. Said TVP President Kurski, "Polish public television feels responsible for defending the Polish raison d’état, which is why we hastened TVP World’s debut."

Programmes 
TVP Info broadcasts news bulletins every half an hour around the clock. TVP Info simulcasts TVP World, the English-language news channel of TVP during late nights, and during the day it broadcasts current affairs programs. A partial list follows:
 Break the Fake
 Eastern Express with Jonasz Rewiński
 Poranek Info (Info Morning - morning news)
 Pogoda Info (Info Weather - Polish and European forecasts)
 Serwis Info Poranek (Morning Info Service  - live news segment every half hour during Poranek Info)
 Info Biznes (Business Info - business news)
 Serwis Info Dzień (Info Day Service - midday news)
 Sport Info (sports news)
 Minęła 20 (Eight p.m. 20 - talk show)
 Reportaż TVP INFO (reports)
 Panorama Info (main news program)
 Info Wieczór (Evening Info - evening news)
 Debata TVP INFO (Debate TVP INFO - weekly news debate, airing on Saturday two or three times a month)
 Wiadomości (News - TVP1 main news program)
 Teleexpress (TVP1 second news program)
 Panorama (TVP2 main news program)

References

External links

TVP Info at LyngSat Address

Telewizja Polska
24-hour television news channels
Television channels and stations established in 2007
Television channels in Poland
Polish news websites